Brian Joseph Cosgrove OBE (born 6 April 1934)  is an English animator, designer, director, producer and sculptor. With Mark Hall, he founded Cosgrove Hall Films in 1976 and produced successful animated children shows including The Wind in the Willows, Danger Mouse and Count Duckula. In 2012 he won the BAFTA Special Award.

Early life
Born in Manchester, Cosgrove studied at Manchester College of Art and Design. It was there he met his future work partner Mark Hall.

Career
Cosgrove started his career by producing television graphics at Granada Television. He later joined Stop Frame Productions, which his partner at Granada Television,  Mark Hall founded, where he worked on many public service films, commercials for companies like TVTimes and directed and produced animated shows such as The Magic Ball and Sally And Jake.

After Stop Frame Productions was shut down, Cosgrove and Hall founded Cosgrove Hall Films, where they produced some of the most well known animated children's shows and films in Britain, such as Danger Mouse, Count Duckula, The Wind in the Willows (which would later become a 52 episode TV series), Noddy's Toyland Adventures, Bill and Ben and Fifi and the Flowertots until 2009.

In 1989, Cosgrove directed and produced the animated feature film The BFG, based on the Roald Dahl novel of the same name. According to Cosgrove, this is one of the only adaptations, based on one of Roald Dahl's novels, that Dahl himself actually liked.

Since 2011, Cosgrove has been the creator and executive producer of Cosgrove Hall Fitzpatrick Entertainment.

Personal life
Cosgrove is good friends with actor and comedian Sir David Jason, who has been a loyal collaborator on most of his projects.

Filmography

Film

Television

Awards and nominations

References

External links
 

1934 births
Living people
Alumni of Manchester Metropolitan University
BAFTA winners (people)
British animated film directors
British animated film producers
English animators
English film directors
English film producers
English male sculptors
English sculptors
English television directors
English television producers
Officers of the Order of the British Empire